My Own Destruction is the second EP album by the Japanese music group Ellegarden. It was released on October 16, 2002.

Track listing
 (Can't Remember) How We Used to Be - 3:16
 Under Control - 3:21
 Migite (右手, Right Hand) - 4:27
 Mouse Molding - 3:03
 Jamie - 3:58
 Oyasumi (お休み, Good Night) - 4:11

Charts

References

Ellegarden albums
2002 EPs